is a Japanese manga series written and illustrated by Barasui about the adventures of four elementary school girls and their older sister-figure. It began serialization in ASCII Media Works' manga magazine Dengeki Daioh in 2002. In 2005, the manga was adapted into an anime television series and a PlayStation 2 video game. Three original video animation (OVA) episodes were later released from February to April 2007. Another two-episode OVA project titled Strawberry Marshmallow Encore was released in 2009. There is an unrelated manga titled .

Plot

Themes
According to the manga, Strawberry Marshmallow is set in Hamamatsu, Japan. Seasons play an important role throughout Strawberry Marshmallow as the characters are involved in many normal seasonal activities. The series is speckled with many small, music-related allusions, such as Ana's dog Frusciante being named after John Frusciante of the Red Hot Chili Peppers, while episode eight of the anime sees two goldfish called Richard and James. The title itself was inspired from "Mashimaro", a single by Japanese rock artist Tamio Okuda.

Characters

Nobue is the eldest main character. She is Chika's older sister and usually has final authority on all matters. She often tries to "borrow" money from Chika to buy cigarettes. Nobue is perpetually searching for a part-time job to earn money for more cigarettes to calm her nicotine addiction.

The story suggests that Nobue derives some kind of sensual pleasure from watching the girls do cute things. In this respect, Nobue appears to appreciate the moe aesthetic. It is seen during the anime that Nobue prefers Matsuri and Ana over Chika and Miu.

The Nobue character changed from the manga to the anime. In the manga, she is a sixteen-year-old high school freshman, while in the anime she is a twenty-year-old junior-college student. Her age is presumably changed because of her smoking and drinking habit, both becoming legal in Japan at age twenty. In the first episode of the anime, she initially introduces herself as a sixteen-year-old, intended to be a joke as she quickly states that she is really twenty. She tends to act somewhat less mature in her manga incarnation, doing things such as tricking Matsuri into thinking that Miu is dead. Her appearance changes radically in the early stages of the manga, especially her hair, which goes from blond to dark brown (and is black in the anime).

Chika is one of two twelve-year-olds in the story. Chika is the same age as Miu, and attends the same class as her neighbor Miu. Chika is a cheerful girl who shows more common sense than the other girls, especially Miu. Her main role in the series is that of an average, twelve-year-old girl, which is emphasized in the first manga volume, where Nobue describes Chika as specializing 'in being totally generic'. Her special skill is cooking, especially baking cookies. Chika is Nobue's little sister. She is nicknamed Chi-chan or just Chi.

Miu is another twelve-year-old girl who is depicted in the story as having a problem-child personality. A childhood friend of Chika, she lives next door to the Ito house and attends the same class as Chika. Miu likes to say random things out of the blue and often plays pranks on Matsuri and Ana, but is most of the time interrupted by Nobue (and sometimes by Chika), ending up lying face-down on the floor. She has the least common sense or manners of the girls, and is rarely taken seriously because of her weird ideas and comments. She seems to harbor some sort of jealousy of Ana and Matsuri, because Nobue finds them cuter. She does not have any delicacy and tends to do things that bother people around her. Miu is nicknamed "Mi-chan". Miu has been described as "Yotsuba Koiwai with fangs".
While she is often causing trouble for the other girls, an interview with the cast that was published in volume 4 of the manga series reveals that Miu is extremely fond of Chika, whom she dubs as her 'one and only'. The interview also goes on to claim that Miu derives satisfaction from amusing Chika, and that she will never go to bed before making sure that Chika's room light is turned off. There are also scenes within the manga which hint at signs of lesbianism from Miu towards Chika; when Miu reveals that the both of them have kissed and rubbed each other's breasts, Chika makes no attempt to deny the claims or defend herself.

Matsuri, nicknamed "Mats" in the manga, is an eleven-year-old glasses-wearing girl with a pet ferret named John, and is depicted as having a very timid personality in the story. She is often the subject of Miu's teasing and can resort to crying and hiding behind Nobue. She is one grade below Chika and Miu, in the same class as Ana, with whom she quickly became friends. Matsuri discovers that Ana can speak Japanese fluently and helps her hide both her Japanese language skills and her lack of English language skills from the rest of their class. While she has gray hair in the anime, her hair is white in the manga.

Ana is an eleven-year-old girl who originally came from Cornwall, England, five years before the series, but seems to have forgotten how to speak English. She first pretends that she speaks only English, but it is not long before she is discovered by Matsuri while speaking very polite Japanese. Matsuri tries to help her re-learn English. Ana is often teased by Miu because of her name, Ana Coppola, which in Japanese sounds like a typical psychomime (a form of onomatopoeic sound). Ana really dislikes her last name for that and becomes angry every time Miu calls her "Coppola-chan". Miu also makes things worse by spelling her name in kanji to mean . Ana's "proper Japanese" personality is reflected by her very traditionally feminine and polite speaking style. And her impressive knowledge of Japanese words, kanji, customs and traditions makes her more "Japanese" than most Japanese people (which she also tries to hide). Later in the series, her ability to speak Japanese is discovered by the other students in her class. Ana owns a pet dog.

Media

Manga

The Strawberry Marshmallow manga, written and illustrated by Barasui, began serialization in ASCII Media Works's Dengeki Daioh magazine on February 15, 2002. The first tankōbon was released on January 27, 2003, and seven volumes have been released as of March 27, 2013. The manga has been licensed and is published by Tokyopop in both the United States and Germany; the French company Kurokawa also has licensed the manga. The Tokyopop release was canceled after volume 5 due to low sales and is now out of print. Early chapters of the manga break the fourth wall, especially in the first volume, where Chika often turns to face the readers when describing her plight. The manga currently publishes on an irregular basis with an inconsistent number of pages per issue.

Anime

A 12-episode Strawberry Marshmallow anime series produced by Daume and directed by Takuya Satō aired in Japan between July 14 and October 13, 2005 on the TBS Japanese television network. The anime series was licensed for English language distribution by Geneon, but due to the shutdown of their anime division, the series went out of print. The anime series was later re-licensed by Sentai Filmworks. Three original video animation (OVA) episodes were later released between February 23 and April 25, 2007. A two-episode OVA series titled Strawberry Marshmallow Encore was released between January 23 and March 25, 2009.

Audio CDs
Five Strawberry Marshmallow drama CDs were released between July 22, 2005 and August 25, 2006 on the Frontier Works record label. They use the same voice actresses as the anime. There have also been four character song singles (one for each girl except Nobue), two soundtrack albums for the original anime, and two soundtrack albums for the OVA.

Visual novel

The visual novel, under the original title of Ichigo Mashimaro, was developed by ASCII Media Works for the PlayStation 2 based on the series under an all-ages CERO rating. The game was first released on August 11, 2005, and was re-released on March 8, 2007 under a 'The Best' budget price.

Differences between media
There are several, large differences between the manga and anime versions of the series such as the much earlier introduction of Ana in the anime than the manga. In the manga, Ana does not appear until the second volume, while she makes her debut in the second episode of the anime. Events that take place in the manga never appeared in the anime, and chapters that were adapted were mixed together or were altered. For example: episode seven of the anime, "Going to the Sea", mixes elements of episode nine, "Critical Investigation", and ten, "Beach Challenge" of the first volume of the manga. While Ana is present in the anime episode, she was not in the manga versions at all. Character designs were extremely inconsistent in the early stages of the manga, before Barasui knew that Strawberry Marshmallow would become a series.

Character designs are even more inconsistent with the visual novel, which uses a mix between the manga and anime's styles while throwing in some new departures of its own. For example: Matsuri has blonde hair in the visual novel, whereas she has white or gray hair in other mediums. Early chapters of the manga also had Miu drawn almost identical to Chika, with their hair length being the only visible difference between them.

In addition, some of the girls' personalities are slightly different in each media: Matsuri is shown to be a little more defensive in the manga than her anime counterpart, which was demonstrated by her slapping or shoving Miu away when the latter got overboard with her pranks, while she never (deliberately) laid a finger on Miu in the anime. There are also subtle differences in Miu and Chika's personalities between the manga and the anime: Miu is more random and unpredictable in the manga compared to her anime counterpart. Chika is also targeted by Miu more often in the manga as compared to the anime (but not as much as Matsuri is), resulting in more outbursts of anger from her in the manga.

Reception
Strawberry Marshmallow has received positive reviews in English. Carlo Santos from Anime News Network has described Strawberry Marshmallow as "a clever little comedy that delivers laughs via its straight-faced approach" and has mentioned that "There is something uniquely appealing about Marshmallow'''s deadpan delivery". Dirk Deppey from The Comics Journal stated that "Barasui sets up his comic situations with little if any extraneous padding and plays out the resulting gags with the skill and grace of a master craftsman".
Erica Friedman of Yuricon has called the series "too-cute-to-hate". Friedman has also criticized the English-language adaptation of the manga for not providing any translations for sound effects and not giving any explanations for some puns. Jason Thompson, writing about The Last Uniform for the appendix to Manga: The Complete Guide, contrasts the two series and calls Strawberry Marshmallow "purely juvenile gaze-into-the-girls-world stuff".

References

External links
Strawberry Marshmallow at Dengeki Daioh'' 
Strawberry Marshmallow at TBS 

2005 anime television series debuts
2005 video games
2007 anime OVAs
2009 anime OVAs
ASCII Media Works manga
Bishōjo games
Comedy anime and manga
Dengeki Comics
Dengeki Daioh
Geneon USA
Japan-exclusive video games
MediaWorks games
NBCUniversal Entertainment Japan
PlayStation 2 games
PlayStation 2-only games
Sentai Filmworks
Shōnen manga
Slice of life anime and manga
TBS Television (Japan) original programming
Tokyopop titles
Visual novels
Video games developed in Japan